The Weeknd in Japan is the first greatest hits album by Canadian singer the Weeknd. It features singles from his first three studio albums: Kiss Land (2013), Beauty Behind the Madness (2015) and Starboy (2016), his first feature  with Belly, "Might Not", from the rapper's eighth mixtape Up for Days (2015) and the songs "Call Out My Name" and "Wasted Times" from his EP My Dear Melancholy (2018). It was released, digitally and physically, exclusively in Japan on November 21, 2018, by Universal Music Japan. The album's release occurred shortly before the start of the Weeknd Asia Tour (2018).

Release and artwork
The Weeknd in Japan was released on November 21, 2018, by Universal Music Japan to commemorate Tesfaye's first performance in Japan, at the Makuhari Messe in December 2018, as a part of his 2018 tour, the Weeknd Asia Tour. It follows the release of his EP My Dear Melancholy, which was released earlier in the year, and includes various songs from the setlists of his aforementioned tour.

The album's cover incorporates various aspects of the posters which were used to promote the Weeknd Asia Tour (2018).

Track listing
Track listing adapted from iTunes.

 denotes a co-producer
 denotes a remix producer
 "Party Monster" features background vocals by Lana Del Rey
 "Wanderlust (Pharrell remix)" features background vocals by Pharrell Williams

Charts

Release history

References

2018 greatest hits albums
2018 compilation albums
The Weeknd albums
Universal Music Japan albums
Republic Records compilation albums
Albums produced by Illangelo
Albums produced by Pharrell Williams
Albums produced by Max Martin
Albums produced by Cirkut
Albums produced by Guy-Manuel de Homem-Christo
Albums produced by Thomas Bangalter
Albums produced by Frank Dukes